Nanna Bergitte Caroline With (30 May 1874 – 22 February 1965) was a Norwegian journalist, voice pedagogue and organizational leader.

Early life and career 
She was born in Andenes, Norway, a daughter of ship owner and politician Richard With and Oline Sophie Wennberg. She was editor-in-chief of the newspaper Vesteraalens Avis from 1905 to 1907, and Hver 8. Dag from 1907 to 1919. From 1914 to 1919 she also edited a sports paper, Sportsmanden.

Her biographical dictionary Illustrert Biografisk Leksikon was published between 1916 and 1920. She founded, co-founded or chaired a number of organizations.

References 

1874 births
1965 deaths
People from Andøy
Norwegian newspaper editors
Norwegian biographers
Norwegian encyclopedists
Women encyclopedists
Norwegian women non-fiction writers
Women biographers
Women newspaper editors
Articles needing translation from Norwegian Wikipedia
Norwegian Association for Women's Rights people